Draft lottery can refer to:

 NBA Draft Lottery, a lottery determining the order of the teams for the first 14 selections in the NBA Draft
 Sports draft
 Draft lottery (1969), the system whereby the United States conscripted soldiers during the Vietnam War
 NHL Draft Lottery, a lottery to determine the order of the teams for the first 15 selections in the NHL Entry Draft
 WWE Draft Lottery, Wrestlers are picked "randomly" to compete on the other competing WWE Brand